Gulval is a village in Cornwall, United Kingdom. Although historically a parish in its own right, Gulval was incorporated into the parishes of Penzance, Madron and Ludgvan in 1934, and is now considered to be a suburb of Penzance. This list contains listed buildings that are now within the parish of Penzance. It contains eight listed buildings that are recorded in the National Heritage List for England. Of these, one is Grade II*, the middle of the three grades, and the others are Grade II, the lowest grade. Four of the listed buildings are houses, the others are the parish church, one of the lychgates, a nonconformist chapel and a telephone box.

References

Citations

Sources

 
 
 
 
 
 
 
 

Cornish culture
Lists of listed buildings in Cornwall
Buildings and structures in Penzance